The 2021 WCHA Men's Ice Hockey Tournament was the 62nd and final tournament in the history of the men's Western Collegiate Hockey Association. The tournament was held between March 12 and March 20, 2021. Quarterfinal games were played on home campus sites while semifinal- and championship-round games were held at the Mayo Clinic Health System Event Center, the home venue for Minnesota State. By winning the tournament, Lake Superior State received the WCHA's automatic bid for the 2021 NCAA Division I Men's Ice Hockey Tournament.

After the 2020–21 season, the men's WCHA disbanded after seven of its members left to reestablish the Central Collegiate Hockey Association. Two other members dropped men's hockey after the season. The WCHA remains in operation as a women-only league.

Format
The first round of the postseason tournament featured a best-of-three games format, while the semifinals and final were single games held at the campus site of the highest remaining seed. The top eight conference teams participated in the tournament. Teams were seeded No. 1 through No. 8 according to their final conference standings, with a tiebreaker system used to seed teams with an identical number of points accumulated. The higher seeded teams each earned home ice and hosted one of the lower seeded teams.

Conference standings

Bracket

Note: * denotes overtime periods

Results

Quarterfinals

(1) Minnesota State vs. (8) Ferris State

(2) Lake Superior State vs. (7) Alabama–Hutsville

(3) Bowling Green vs. (6) Northern Michigan

(4) Bemidji State vs. (5) Michigan Tech

Semifinals

(1) Minnesota State vs. (6) Northern Michigan

(2) Lake Superior State vs. (4) Bemidji State

Championship

(2) Lake Superior State vs. (6) Northern Michigan

Tournament awards

Most Outstanding Player
Ashton Calder (Lake Superior State)

References

WCHA Men's Ice Hockey Tournament
WCHA Men's Ice Hockey Tournament